The 2019 AFC U-16 Women's Championship qualification is a women's under-16 football competition which decides the participating teams of the 2019 AFC U-16 Women's Championship.

A total of eight teams qualify to play in the final tournament held in Thailand, four of which are decided by qualification.

Teams
Of the 47 AFC member associations, a total of 33 teams entered the competition, with North Korea, South Korea, and Japan, automatically qualified for the final tournament by their position as the top three teams of the 2017 AFC U-16 Women's Championship and thus not participating in qualification. The final tournament hosts Thailand, despite having automatically qualified for the final tournament, entered to participate in qualification. As a result, a total of 30 teams entered qualification. Due to the increased number of teams, two qualification rounds were scheduled for the first time.

The draw for the first round of the qualifiers was held on 30 May 2018, 15:00 MYT (UTC+8), at the AFC House in Kuala Lumpur, Malaysia. For the first round, the 30 teams were drawn into six groups of five teams. The teams were seeded according to their performance in the 2017 AFC U-16 Women's Championship final tournament and qualification. The following restrictions were also applied:
The six teams which indicated their intention to serve as qualification group hosts prior to the draw were drawn into separate groups.

Notes
Teams in bold automatically qualified for the final tournament.
Teams in italics advanced to second round.
(H): Qualification first round group hosts
(Q): Automatically qualified for final tournament regardless of first round qualification results, and did not advance to second round
(W): Withdrew after draw

Did not enter

Player eligibility
Players born between 1 January 2003 and 31 December 2005 are eligible to compete in the tournament.

Format
In each group, teams play each other once at a centralised venue.
In the first round, the six group winners and the two best runners-up advance to the second round. However, the final tournament hosts Thailand do not advance to the second round. If they win their group, the runner-up of their group advances to the second round, or if they are among the two best runners-up, the third best runner-up advances to the second round.
In the second round, the two group winners and the two group runners-up qualify for the final tournament to join the four automatically qualified teams.

Tiebreakers
Teams are ranked according to points (3 points for a win, 1 point for a draw, 0 points for a loss), and if tied on points, the following tiebreaking criteria are applied, in the order given, to determine the rankings (Regulations Article 9.3):
Points in head-to-head matches among tied teams;
Goal difference in head-to-head matches among tied teams;
Goals scored in head-to-head matches among tied teams;
If more than two teams are tied, and after applying all head-to-head criteria above, a subset of teams are still tied, all head-to-head criteria above are reapplied exclusively to this subset of teams;
Goal difference in all group matches;
Goals scored in all group matches;
Penalty shoot-out if only two teams are tied and they met in the last round of the group;
Disciplinary points (yellow card = 1 point, red card as a result of two yellow cards = 3 points, direct red card = 3 points, yellow card followed by direct red card = 4 points);
Drawing of lots.

First round
The first round was played between 15 and 23 September 2018.

Group A
All matches were held in Sri Lanka.
Times listed are UTC+5:30.

Group B
All matches were held in Mongolia.
Times listed are UTC+8.

Group C
All matches were held in Tajikistan.
Times listed are UTC+5.

Group D
All matches were held in Kyrgyzstan.
Times listed are UTC+6.

Group E
All matches were held in Nepal.
Times listed are UTC+5:45.

Group F
All matches were held in Bangladesh.
Times listed are UTC+6.

Ranking of second-placed teams
Due to groups having different number of teams (after the withdrawal of Syria from Group E), the results against the fifth-placed teams in five-team groups are not considered for this ranking.

Second round
The draw for the second round of the qualifiers was held on 7 November 2018, 11:00 MYT (UTC+8), at the AFC House in Kuala Lumpur, Malaysia. For the second round, the eight teams were drawn into two groups of four teams. The teams were seeded according to their performance in the 2017 AFC U-16 Women's Championship final tournament and qualification. The following restrictions were also applied:
The two teams which indicated their intention to serve as qualification group hosts prior to the draw were drawn into separate groups.

Notes
Teams in bold qualified for the final tournament.
(H): Qualification second round group hosts

The second round was played between 27 February – 7 March 2019.

Group A
All matches were held in Laos.
Times listed are UTC+7.

Group B
All matches were held in Myanmar.
Times listed are UTC+6:30.

Qualified teams
The following eight teams qualified for the final tournament.

1 Bold indicates champions for that year. Italic indicates hosts for that year.

Goalscorers
First round: 
Second round: 
In total

References

External links
, the-AFC.com
AFC U-16 Women's Championship 2019, stats.the-AFC.com

Qualification
2019
U-16 Women's Championship qualification
U-16 Women's Championship qualification
2018 in women's association football
2019 in women's association football
2018 in youth association football
2019 in youth association football
September 2018 sports events in Asia
February 2019 sports events in Asia
March 2019 sports events in Asia